Sven Hjertsson (7 March 1924 – 12 November 1999) was a Swedish footballer who played as a defender. He was also part of Sweden's squad at the 1952 Summer Olympics, but he did not play in any matches.

References

Association football defenders
Swedish footballers
Sweden international footballers
Allsvenskan players
Malmö FF players
1924 births
1999 deaths